Rumba Palace  is an album by Arturo Sandoval, released in 2007. In the United States, the album reached a peak position of number 20 on Billboard Top Jazz Albums charts.

Track listing

 "A Gozar" - 4:08
 "Guarachando" - 6:01
 "El Huracán Del Caribe" - 5:21
 "21st Century" - 7:10
 "Sexy Lady" - 5:09
 "Peaceful" - 3:44
 "Having Fun" - 6:18
 "Arranca De Nuevo" - 5:26
 "Rumba Palace" - 5:53
 "Nouveau Cha Cha" - 4:53

References

2007 albums
Arturo Sandoval albums
Latin Grammy Award for Best Latin Jazz Album